"Fishnet" is a 1988 single by the former lead singer of The Time, Morris Day.  The single was Day's most successful solo hit, peaking at number 23 on the Hot 100, and reaching number one on the soul singles chart, for two weeks.  "Fishnet" also peaked at number twelve on the dance charts.

References

1988 singles
1988 songs
Songs written by Jimmy Jam and Terry Lewis